was a town located in Motoyoshi District, Miyagi Prefecture, Japan.

In 2003, the town had an estimated population of 5,501 and a population density of 139.34 persons per km². The total area was 39.48 km².

On October 1, 2005, Utatsu merged with the town of Shizugawa (also from Motoyoshi District) to create the town of Minamisanriku, and no longer exists as an independent municipality.

External links
Official website of Minamisanriku 

Dissolved municipalities of Miyagi Prefecture
Minamisanriku, Miyagi